The RMS Franconia was an ocean liner operated by the Cunard Line from 1922 to 1956. She was second of three liners named Franconia which served the Cunard Line, the others being  built in 1910 and the third Franconia in 1963.

Pre-War

She was launched on 21 October 1922 at the John Brown & Co shipyard in Clydebank, Scotland. Her maiden voyage was between Liverpool and New York in June 1923; she was employed on this route in the summer months until World War II. In the winter she was used on world cruises.

On 26 December 1926, Franconia ran aground at San Juan, Puerto Rico and was refloated three days later.

She had a collision in Shanghai harbour in April 1929 with an Italian gunboat and a Japanese cargo steamer.

Wartime service
In September 1939, she was requisitioned  as a troopship after refitting at Liverpool. She had a collision off Malta with a French troop ship called the Marietta Pacha and was escorted to Malta by the armed merchant cruiser , but was repaired in time to take part in the Norwegian campaign. On 16 June 1940, while en route to St Nazaire as part of Operation Aerial (the evacuation of the Second British Expeditionary Force from France), she was damaged by near-misses from German bombs and was escorted back to Liverpool for repairs.

Later in the war, she took troops to India and took part in landings at Madagascar, North Africa, Italy and the Azores. In 1945 she was used as a headquarters ship for Winston Churchill and the British delegation at the Yalta Conference. At the end of the war in Europe, Franconia made several trips across the Atlantic carrying returning US troops and refugees. After VJ Day she was employed repatriating British troops, including freed Prisoners of War, from India. During her government service, she had covered  and carried 189,239 military personnel.

Post-war
Franconia was returned to Cunard in June 1948 and was refitted on Clydeside; finally resuming passenger service on 2 June 1949 on the Liverpool to Quebec and Liverpool to Halifax routes. In this role, Franconia brought many postwar immigrants and refugees to Canada. The ship sailed from Liverpool 28 June 1949 and arrived Quebec 5 July and sailed from Liverpool again 21 July arriving Quebec 28 July. In July 1950 she went aground on the Île d'Orléans in the Saint Lawrence River after leaving Quebec. After being pulled off the reef she was repaired and resumed in service on the Canadian run in September 1950. The Franconia was retired in 1956 with her fleetmate  having been replaced on the Canadian run by the Saxonia, Ivernia and the Carinthia.

Legacy
Franconia's pre-war around-the-world cruises and distinguished wartime service made her a popular name within Cunard so in 1963,  was renamed Franconia to continue the name within the company. In recognition of her important Canadian immigration role, Cunard Line gave the builder's model of Franconia to the Maritime Museum of the Atlantic in Halifax, Nova Scotia.

Gallery

References

External links

 

1922 ships
Ocean liners
Passenger ships of the United Kingdom
Ships of the Cunard Line
Steamships
Troop ships of the United Kingdom
Maritime incidents in 1926
Maritime incidents in 1929